Trichosphaeria is a genus of fungi in the family Trichosphaeriaceae. There are about 25 species in this widespread genus, and they are typically found in woody habitats.

References

Sordariomycetes genera
Trichosphaeriales
Taxa named by Karl Wilhelm Gottlieb Leopold Fuckel
Taxa described in 1870